Gornall is a surname. Notable people with the surname include:

Alan Gornall (born 1960), British cyclist
Amy Gornall (born 1996), British cyclist
James Gornall (1899–1983), British cricketer
Linda Gornall (born 1964), British cyclist
Mark Gornall (born 1961), British cyclist